The  was held on 5 February 2023.

Awards
 Best Film: - Love Is Light
 Best Director: Keiichi Kobayashi - Love Is Light
 Yoshimitsu Morita Memorial Best New Director: Chie Hayakawa - Plan 75
 Best Screenplay: Kōsuke Mukai - A Man
 Best Cinematographer: Ryūto Kondō - A Man
 Best Actress:
 Chieko Baisho - Plan 75
 Riho Yoshioka - Anime Supremacy! and Shimamori no Tō
 Best Actor: Kōji Seto - Love Nonetheless
 Best Supporting Actress: Yuumi Kawai - A Man, Plan 75, Love Nonetheless, A Winter Rose and Just Remembering
 Best Supporting Actor:
 Hayato Isomura - The Fish Tale, Plan 75, Offbeat Cops and Prior Convictions
 Tasuku Emoto - Anime Supremacy!, No Place to Go, and Riverside Mukolitta
 Best Newcomer:
 Nanase Nishino - Love Is Light
 Fūju Kamio - Love Is Light
 Yuna Taira - Love Is Light
 Fumika Baba - Love Is Light
 Examiner Special Award: the staff and cast of Anime Supremacy!

Top 10

References

Yokohama Film Festival
Yokohama Film Festival
2023 in Japanese cinema
Y